Fernanda Paz Pinilla Roa (born 6 November 1993) is a Chilean footballer who plays as a defender for Club Universidad de Chile and the Chile women's national team.

Club career
On 21 June 2019, Pinilla signed with Spanish Primera División B side Santa Teresa CD.

International career
Pinilla represented Chile at the 2010 FIFA U-17 Women's World Cup. She was a last minute replacement for injured Ana Gutiérrez taking her place at the 2019 FIFA Women's World Cup.

Personal life
She has a BA in Physics at the University of Chile.

In June 2022, she married Grace Lazcano, a sport journalist working for ESPN Chile.

Political views
In 2019, she joined Social Convergence, left-wing political party.

References

External links

1993 births
Living people
Chilean women's footballers
People from Santiago Metropolitan Region
Women's association football fullbacks
Women's association football central defenders
Women's association football midfielders
Chile women's international footballers
2019 FIFA Women's World Cup players
South American Games silver medalists for Chile
South American Games medalists in football
Competitors at the 2014 South American Games
Audax Italiano footballers
Universidad de Chile footballers
University of Chile alumni
Segunda Federación (women) players
Santa Teresa CD players
Chilean expatriate women's footballers
Chilean expatriate sportspeople in Spain
Expatriate women's footballers in Spain
Lesbian sportswomen
LGBT association football players
Chilean LGBT sportspeople
Chilean lesbians
Chilean feminists
Lesbian feminists
Footballers at the 2020 Summer Olympics
Olympic footballers of Chile
Social Convergence politicians
20th-century Chilean women
21st-century Chilean women